Forbairt Feirste is a Belfast-based Irish language development agency that aims to utilise  Belfast’s Irish-speaking community to help promote the Irish language; support Irish speakers living in and visiting the city; and support the city in general. The agency was set up in 1994.

It has been successful in working with businesses in Nationalist areas of Belfast to erect Irish language or bilingual signage and are one of the main Irish language organisations who promote the Gaeltacht Quarter in West Belfast.

As of 2018, their director was Jake MacSiacais who had been in the position since 2004.

See also

 Irish language Gaeilge.
 Gael-Taca Similar organisation based in Cork City.
 Gaillimh le Gaeilge Similar organisation based in Galway City.
 Gaeltacht Irish speaking regions in Ireland
 Irish language in Northern Ireland
 Líonraí Gaeilge Irish Language Networks
 List of Irish language media
 Irish language outside Ireland
 List of organisations in Irish Language Movement

References

Irish language organisations
Culture in Belfast
Celtic language advocacy organizations
1994 establishments in Northern Ireland